Neil Grewcock (born 26 April 1962) is an English former professional footballer. He played for Leicester City, Gillingham and Burnley and made over 200 appearances in the Football League.

References

1962 births
Living people
Footballers from Leicester
English footballers
Association football midfielders
Leicester City F.C. players
Gillingham F.C. players
Shepshed Dynamo F.C. players
Burnley F.C. players
Burnley Bank Hall F.C. players
English Football League players